The Drottningholm Music (Swedish: Drottningholmsmusiken) is the popular name of the music that was composed by Johan Helmich Roman and first performed at Drottningholm Palace at Lovön near Stockholm on 18 August 1744 at the wedding of Crown Prince Adolf Frederick and Princess Louisa Ulrika of Prussia.

The music was composed especially for the royal wedding, and consists of 33 movements. The movements are very different from each other; there is music both for ceremonious entries and for dance, for example minuets. The wedding was celebrated in three days, under which the royal orchestra, directed by Roman, is believed to have been strengthened by the orchestra that Adolf Frederick had brought from Germany. The number of musicians was approximately 24.

References 
 

Compositions by Johan Helmich Roman
Baroque compositions
Swedish royal weddings